Tubinidae is an extinct taxonomic family of fossil sea snails,  marine, gastropod mollusks in the clade Neritimorpha, the nerites and their allies.

Genera
Genera within the family Tubinidae include: 
 Tubina, the type genus
 Colubrella
 Keration
 Meandrella
 Pseudotubina
 Semitubina
 Serpentubina

References

 Paleobiology database info on this family

Prehistoric gastropods